Boucagnères is a commune in the Gers department in southwestern France. It is situated near the river Gers, between Auch, the capital city of Gers, and Seissan, on the road D 929 in southern direction to Lannemezan.

Geography

Population

See also
Communes of the Gers department

References

Communes of Gers